Chris Liljenberg Halstrøm (born 1977 in Glostrup, Denmark) is a Danish furniture designer and artist. The daughter of a Swedish mother and a Danish father, she has studied design in both Stockholm, Berlin and in Copenhagen at the Royal Danish Academy of Fine Arts, graduating in 2007.  She specializes in furniture design and textile art.

Based in both Copenhagen, Denmark and Småland, Sweden Halstrøm's designs reflect the lightness of form typical of Scandinavian minimalism. Like most of her furniture, her four-legged George Stool, named after her eldest son, is tinted in hues of charcoal grey and natural wood. Made of ash with a grey woolen cushion, it is carefully crafted with a cushion extending slightly over the seat.

References

External links
Christina Liljenberg Halstrøm's website

1977 births
Danish designers
Danish women architects
Danish women designers
Architects from Copenhagen
Danish furniture designers
Danish people of Swedish descent
People from Glostrup Municipality
Living people
Royal Danish Academy of Fine Arts alumni